William H. Wood may refer to:

 William H. Wood, president of the National Association of Letter Carriers, 1889–90
 William H. Wood (American football) (1900–1988), American athlete, and football coach at the United States Military Academy
 William Halsey Wood (1855–1897), American architect, based in Newark, New Jersey
 William Henry Wood, British trade unionist, active in the 1860s

See also
 William Wood (disambiguation)